Talk Radio is a 1987 Pulitzer Prize-nominated play written by Eric Bogosian, based on a concept by Bogosian and Tad Savinar.

Plot
The story of Barry Champlain, a Cleveland-area shock jock, on the eve of his radio show's national syndication.

History
The play, with Bogosian in the lead role, premiered off-Broadway at The Public Theater on May 28, 1987, in a production directed by Frederick Zollo. The production also featured John C. McGinley, Zach Grenier, Mark Metcalf, and Peter Onorati.

1988 film adaptation
A film adaptation of Talk Radio, directed by Oliver Stone, was released one year later. Bogosian reprised the title role; however the setting was changed from Cleveland to Dallas. It also starred Alec Baldwin and one of the play's co-stars, John C. McGinley.

Revivals
A production was staged at the Edinburgh Festival Fringe in 2006, directed by Stewart Lee, featuring Mike McShane, Phil Nichol, and Stephen K. Amos.

Talk Radio made its Broadway premiere on March 11, 2007, in a production starring Liev Schreiber, and featuring Stephanie March and Peter Hermann (Law & Order: SVU), and  Sebastian Stan (Captain America: The Winter Soldier).  The opening night cast also included Christine Pedi, Barbara Rosenblat, Adam Seitz, Marc Thompson,  Kit Williamson, Cornell Womack and Christy Pusz. The show made its final Broadway performance at the Longacre Theater on June 24, 2007.

Accolades
The 2007 show was directed by Tony Award-winner Robert Falls, and has received Tony, Drama Desk, Outer Critics Circle, and Drama League award nominations for Best Revival of Play and Best Actor in a Play. Additionally, Schreiber was awarded the prestigious Drama League Award for Distinguished Performance.

The 1987 original was one of the finalists for the Pulitzer Prize for Drama.

References

Bibliography
 Rossi, Umberto. “Acousmatic Presences: From DJs to Talk-Radio Hosts in American Fiction, Cinema, and Drama”, Mosaic, 42:1, March 2009, pp. 83–98.

External links 
Official Talk Radio on Broadway website

1987 plays
American plays adapted into films
Cleveland in fiction
Off-Broadway plays
Plays by Eric Bogosian
Plays set in Ohio
Works about radio people